Mouk-Aria is an Austronesian language spoken by about 600 individuals along coastal West New Britain Province, Papua New Guinea on the island of New Britain.

References

External links
EE-TAOW! The Mouk Story (Part 1) - New Tribes Mission 1999, featuring several Mouk speakers.

Ngero–Vitiaz languages
Languages of West New Britain Province